IBC News Tonight is a weeknight 30-minute news program aired on IBC 13 in the Philippines. Originally anchored by Elmer Mercado and Anthony Pangilinan. It aired from January 7, 2002 to August 5, 2011, replacing Ronda Trese and was replaced by News Team 13. Jake Morales and Cathy Eigenmann serves as the final anchors.

Background
The newscast premiered on January 7, 2002, replacing Ronda Trese. It was first anchored by Elmer Mercado and Anthony Pangilinan. Mercado and Pangilinan bowed out the newscast and was later replaced by Noli Eala several months later. However, Eala eventually left the newscast in 2003 to be appointed as the commissioner of the Philippine Basketball Association. He was later replaced by Dennis Principe but left the newscast in 2006 to be acquired by NBN (now PTV), also a government-controlled network. Principe would later be replaced by Gina dela Vega-Cruz as the sole anchor of the newscast. On April 16, 2007, former ABS-CBN and RPN business correspondent Joee Guilas as co-anchor with dela Vega-Cruz. Guilas and dela Vega-Cruz both left the show to be replaced by the female tandem of Rida Reyes and Thea Gavino on August 4, 2008. Reyes soon left the newscast on November 7, 2008, to be acquired by GMA Network, and was replaced by Atty. Zorah Andam on November 10, 2008, as co-anchor with Gavino. Gavino and Andam bowed out the newscast until the latter was replaced by the returning Joee Guilas in late 2010.

Former IBC Express Balita anchors Jake Morales and Cathy Eigenmann replaced Guilas on June 20, 2011, as the new and final anchors. The newscast ceased airing on August 5, 2011, to make way for the evening edition of News Team 13.

Anchors
Elmer Mercado (2002)
Anthony Pangilinan (2002)
Noli Eala (2002–2003)
Dennis Principe (2003–2006)
Gina dela Vega-Cruz (2006–2008)
Joee Guilas (2007–2008; 2010–2011)
Rida Reyes (2008)
Thea Gavino (2008–2010)
Zorah Andam (2008–2010)
Jake Morales (2011)
Cathy Eigenmann (2011)

Substitute anchors
Karen Tayao-Cabrera
Jess Caduco
Bing Formento

See also
List of programs previously broadcast by Intercontinental Broadcasting Corporation
IBC News and Public Affairs

2000s Philippine television series
2010s Philippine television series
2002 Philippine television series debuts
2011 Philippine television series endings
Philippine television news shows
Filipino-language television shows
Intercontinental Broadcasting Corporation original programming
IBC News and Public Affairs
Intercontinental Broadcasting Corporation news shows